Konstantin Poznyak is a retired Ukrainian professional footballer who played as a defender.

Career
Konstantin Poznyak, started his career in 1998 with Desna Chernihiv  the club in the city of Chernihiv. Here he stayed until 2005 where he played 144 and scored 1 goal in 1999–2000 in Ukrainian Second League. In 2000–01 he played 27 matches in Ukrainian Second League where he got 2 place in the league and in the season 2001–02 he played 29 matches. In 2005 he moved to Hirnyk Kryvyi Rih in Ukrainian Second League where in the season 2005–06 where he played 8 matches. In 2006 he moved to Avanhard Koryukivka and in 2011 he moved to Niva Chernihiv where in 2012 he played 13 matches.

References

External links 
 Konstantin Poznyak at footballfacts.ru

1977 births
Living people
Footballers from Chernihiv
FC Desna Chernihiv players
FC Hirnyk Kryvyi Rih players
FC Avanhard Koriukivka players
SDYuShOR Desna players
Ukrainian footballers
Ukrainian Premier League players
Ukrainian First League players
Ukrainian Second League players
Association football defenders